Campitelli is the 10th  of Rome, identified by the initials R. X, and is located in the Municipio I.

Its emblem consists of a black dragon's head on a white background. This symbol comes from the legend that Pope Silvester I threw out a dragon staying in the Forum Romanum.

History 
Some of the major vestiges of the Ancient Rome are located in the area, such as the Palatine Hill, the Campidoglio and the Roman Forum.

When in the Middle Ages the new administrative subdivision of the city was adopted, Campitelli was the 12th and last rione. It was called Campitelli in Sancti Adriani, after the deconsecrated church of Sant'Adriano al Foro. Since the 12th century, the Palazzo Senatorio became the seat of the Senatore di Roma (Senator of Rome), the principal civic authority of the city in the Middle Ages. The Palazzo Senatorio and the basilica of Santa Maria in Ara Coeli are the only remaining features of the medieval construction industry in the rione.

The rione experienced relevant urban modifications between 1536 and 1546, after Pope Paul III commissioned to Michelangelo the refurbishment of the Campidoglio and of the nearby piazza, to receive Emperor Charles V. Michelangelo's project was brought to completion only in 18th century by Carlo Rainaldi, who built the baroque church of Santa Maria in Campitelli.

The appearance of the area changed relevantly between 19th and 20th century, after the construction of the Victor Emmanuel II Monument and after the massive demolitions performed by the Fascist government.

In 1921 a part of Campitelli was detached and merged into the newly created rione Celio.

Geography

Boundaries
Northward, the rione borders with Pigna (R. IX), whose border is marked by Via di San Marco, Largo Enrico Berlinguer and Piazza Venezia, and also with Trevi (R. II), from which is separated by Piazza Venezia itself and Piazza della Madonna di Loreto.

Eastward, the rione borders with Monti (R. I), the boundary being marked by the whole Via dei Fori Imperiali, and with Celio (R. XIX), from which is separated by Piazza del Colosseo, Via di San Gregorio and Piazza di Porta Capena.

Southward, the border with Ripa (R. XII) is defined by Via dei Cerchi, Via di San Teodoro, Via dei Fienili, Piazza della Consolazione and Vico Jugario.

To the west, the rione borders with Sant'Angelo (R. XI), whose border is marked by Via del Teatro di Marcello, Via Montanara, Piazza di Campitelli, Via Cavalletti, Via dei Delfini, Piazza Margana, Via Margana and Via d'Aracoeli.

Places of interest

Archaeological Sites
Roman Forum
Mamertine Prison
Domus Augustana
Domus Flavia
Domus Severiana
Insula Romana
Curia, Roman Forum
Palace of Domitian
Temple of Antoninus and Faustina
Temple of the Dioscuri
Temple of Divine Julius
Temple of Divine Romulus
Temple of Venus and Rome
Temple of Vesta
Basilica of Maxentius
Basilica Julia
Arch of Septimus Severus
Arch of Titus
Column of Phocas

Palaces and other buildings 
 Campidoglio
 Palazzo Albertoni Spinola
 Palazzo Astalli
 Palazzo Caffarelli al Campidoglio
 Palazzo Capizucchi
 Palazzo Senatorio
 Palazzo dei Conservatori
 Palazzo Massimo di Rignano
 Palazzo Muti Bussi

Museums
 Musei Capitolini
 Museo centrale del Risorgimento

Churches 
Santa Maria in Aracoeli
Basilica of Santa Francesca Romana
San Bonaventura al Palatino
San Sebastiano al Palatino
Santi Cosma e Damiano
San Lorenzo in Miranda
Santa Maria Antiqua
Santi Luca e Martina
San Giuseppe dei Falegnami
Santa Maria Annunziata a Tor de' Specchi
Santa Maria della Consolazione
San Teodoro al Palatino
Basilica of Sant'Anastasia al Palatino
San Biagio de Mercato (deconsecrated)
Sant'Adriano al Foro Romano (deconsecrated)
Santa Maria Liberatrice al Foro Romano (dismantled)
Santi Venanzio e Ansovino (dismantled)
Santi Sergio e Bacco al Foro Romano (dismantled)

Roads and squares 
Piazza del Campidoglio
Piazza Campitelli
Piazza Venezia

Other
Palatine Hill

External links

 History, maps and images of the rione

Rioni of Rome